Coincidences (French: Coïncidences) is a 1947 French drama film directed by Serge Debecque and starring Serge Reggiani, Andrée Clément and Pierre Renoir. It was shot at the Boulogne Studios in Paris and on location in Lyon. The film's sets were designed by the art director Maurice Colasson.

Synopsis
The librarian of a wealthy textile manufacturer from Lyon is in love with his employer's daughter, but she is engaged to another man an army officer. When he is offered three magic balls that will seemingly change his fortunes, he accepts, but they ultimately lead towards a tragic destiny.

Cast
 Serge Reggiani as Jean Ménétrier
 Andrée Clément as 	Françoise
 Pierre Renoir as 	Monsieur Bardolas
 Sylvie as Amélie
 Jean Parédès as 	Montboron
 Pierre Sergeol as Poncet - un assureur 
 Maurice Schutz as Le vieux paysan 
 Louis Florencie as Pierre Calmiran - un assureur 
 Robert Le Béal as 	Gérard Tibur 
 Guy Favières as Le père de Françoise 
 Marcel Vibert as Le médecin
 Suzanne Bara as 	Bardolas' Secretary
 Ulric Guttinguer as 	L'architecte 
 Albert Gercourt as Monsieur Goulard - le contremaître 
 Marcel Charvey as L'agent immobilier 
 Denise Grey as 	Madame Bardolas
 Françoise Delille as 	Michèle

References

Bibliography
 Rège, Philippe. Encyclopedia of French Film Directors, Volume 1. Scarecrow Press, 2009.

External links 
 

1947 films
1940s French-language films
1947 drama films
French drama films
Lux Film films
Films shot in Lyon
Films shot at Boulogne Studios
Films set in Lyon
1940s French films